The 2010 IHSAA Boys Basketball Championship was the 100th annual version in Indiana tournament history. High school basketball plays a significant role in the spring phenomenon known as “Hoosier Hysteria”.  In 2010, Indiana high schools competed in 4 different classes - class A (the smallest schools), class 2A, class 3A, and class 4A.

Brackets
* – Denotes overtime period

Class A Championship

Class 2A Championship

Class 3A Championship

Class 4A Championship

See also
Advanced statistics in basketball
Basketball statistics
Index of basketball-related articles
Indiana High School Boys Basketball Tournament
List of basketball leagues

References

External links
 2009-10 IHSAA Boys Basketball Tournament Results

High school basketball in Indiana
2009–10 in American basketball
Indiana Z